is a Japanese high school in Machida, Tokyo, that was founded as the private Machida Women School in 1929.

References

External links
 Machida High School

Tokyo Metropolitan Government Board of Education schools
High schools in Tokyo
Machida, Tokyo